Joseph Kreutzinger (10 January 1757 – 14 July 1829) was an Austrian painter and engraver.

Kreutzinger was born in Vienna. He was a pupil of the Vienna Academy of Fine Arts and specialized in portraits. Kreutzinger was later appointed Imperial Royal Court Painter. He died in Vienna in 1829.

References

1757 births
1829 deaths
18th-century Austrian painters
18th-century Austrian male artists
Austrian male painters
19th-century Austrian painters
19th-century Austrian male artists
Court painters
Academy of Fine Arts Vienna alumni